Clone of the Universe is the twelfth studio album by American stoner rock band Fu Manchu, released on February 9, 2018 on At The Dojo Records. The album features a guest appearance by Rush guitarist Alex Lifeson on its closing track, the 18-minute mostly instrumental "Il Mostro Atomico." It was produced by Jim Monroe.

Reception

Exclaim! writer Matthew Ritchie said in his review about the album: "Due to the first half's measly runtime (half of its high octane songs clock in at under three minutes) and heavy as hell ending, listening to Clone of the Universe kind of feels like visiting a tapas bar with a few friends, only to drunkenly venture off at the end of the night to slam down a whole duck, solo (and no, that's not a euphemism): it's a journey most would avoid making, but a compelling one for those willing to roll the dice and ride".

Track listing

Personnel
Scott Hill – vocals, guitar
Bob Balch – guitar
Brad Davis – bass
Scott Reeder – drums
Alex Lifeson – guitar (Track 7)

Additional personnel
Carl Saff – mastering

References

Fu Manchu (band) albums
2018 albums